Olindiidae is a family of hydrozoans in the order Limnomedusae. They have a polyp phase and a medusa phase. The polyps are generally small (1 mm) and solitary, but a few species are colonial. They have a varying number of tentacles and can reproduce by budding. Centripetal canals may be present or absent and the radial canals are unbranched. The gonads are beside the radial canals, except in Limnocnida, where they are on the manubrium. The fertilised eggs develop into planula larvae which become polyps. These multiply asexually or can bud off medusae. In some species, medusae are only produced when the water temperature exceeds a certain level. Most species are marine, but several can also be found in brackish water and a few, notably Craspedacusta (such as C. sowerbii) and Limnocnida, are found in fresh water.

Taxonomy
This family is named after its type genus Olindias Muller 1861, but with confusion about the correct spelling, with Olindiadae, Olindiidae, Olindiadidae and Olindiasidae all being used. Haeckel established the family in 1879 as Olindiadae, but his intentions as to the stem of the genus and hence the name of the family are unclear. In 2010,  Calder determined that Olindiidae was the correct form.

Genera
The World Register of Marine Species lists these genera: 
Aglauropsis Mueller, 1865
Astrohydra Hashimoto, 1981
Calpasoma Fuhrmann, 1939
Craspedacusta Lankester, 1880
Cubaia Mayer, 1894
Eperetmus Bigelow, 1915
Gonionemus A. Agassiz, 1862
Gossea L. Agassiz, 1862
Hexaphilia Gershwin & Zeidler, 2003
Limnocnida Günther, 1893
Maeotias Ostroumoff, 1896
Nuarchus Bigelow, 1912
Olindias Mueller, 1861
Scolionema Kishinouye, 1910
Vallentinia Browne, 1902

References

 
Limnomedusae
Cnidarian families
Taxa named by Ernst Haeckel